The men's 10,000 metres speed skating competition of the 2018 Winter Olympics was held on 15 February 2018 at Gangneung Oval in Gangneung, South Korea.

Summary
The event was won by Ted-Jan Bloemen, the world record holder at this distance. Defending champion Jorrit Bergsma was second, and Nicola Tumolero won the bronze medal. During the competition, first Bergsma and then Bloemen set Olympic records. This was the first skating event at the 2018 Olympics not won by a Dutch skater. For Tumolero, this was his first Olympic medal; for Bloemen the gold followed his silver medal at the 5000 m distance a few days earlier.

In the victory ceremony, the medals were presented by Ivan Dibos, member of the International Olympic Committee, accompanied by Nick Thometz, ISU Speed Skating Technical Committee member.

Records
Prior to this competition, the existing world, Olympic and track records were as follows.

The following record was set during this competition.

OR = Olympic record

Results
The race was held at 20:00, local time (UTC+9).

References

Men's speed skating at the 2018 Winter Olympics